Ole Edvard Antonsen (born 25 April 1962) is a Norwegian trumpeter, musician and conductor.

Antonsen was born in Vang, Hedmark, now part of Hamar. He is best known as a solo trumpeter, active in different genres of music; classical music, chamber music, baroque, jazz and pop. Since the mid-2000s, he has also been active as a conductor, foremost with Norwegian Air Force Band.

Discography 

1989 The Virtuoso Trumpet – (with Einar Henning Smebye on piano)
1992 Tour De Force
1993 Trumpet Concertos – (with English Chamber Orchestra and conductor Jeffrey Tate)
1994 Popular Pieces for Trumpet & Organ – (with Wayne Marshall on organ)
1995 Shostakovich Concerto for Piano and Trumpet – (with Berlin Philharmonic Orchestra, conductor Mariss Jansons and Mikhail Rudy on piano)
1997 Read My Lips
1998 Twentieth Century Trumpet – (with Wolfgang Sawallisch on piano)
2000 New Sound of Baroque – (with his brother Jens Petter Antonsen (trumpet) and TrondheimSolistene)
2002 Ars Nova – (with Solveig Kringlebotn (vocals) and Wolfgang Plagge on piano)
2007 Nordic Trumpet Concertos (with Nordic Chamber Orchestra, Christian Lindberg,conductor)
2007 The Golden Age of the Cornet (with the Royal Norwegian Navy Band and conductor Ingar Bergby)
2008 Landscapes

As a sideman (selection) 
2002 With Strings Attached – Willem Breuker Kollektief
2003 Jan van der Roost In Flanders' Fields Vol.39 – Jan van der Roost
2004 Absolute – Spanish Brass Luur Metalls
2004 Frelsesarmeens Juleplate (The Norwegian Salvation Army Christmas album with Nidaros Cathedral Boys' Choir)
2011 Mitt lille land, with other artists

Charts

References

External links 

 
Ole Edvard Antonsen Extended Biography on Norsk Biografisk Leksikon 

1962 births
Living people
Musicians from Hamar
Norwegian trumpeters
Male trumpeters
Spellemannprisen winners
EMI Classics and Virgin Classics artists
21st-century trumpeters
21st-century Norwegian male musicians